The Third Clue is a 1934 British crime film directed by Albert Parker and starring Basil Sydney, Molly Lamont and Raymond Lovell.  The film was based on Neil Gordon's novel The Shakespeare Murders, which also inspired The Claydon Treasure Mystery (1938). It was made at Wembley Studios as a quota quickie by the British subsidiary of 20th Century Fox.

Synopsis
The screenplay concerns two criminals who try to recover loot hidden in an isolated manor house.

Cast
 Basil Sydney as Reinhardt Conway
 Molly Lamont as Rosemary Clayton
 Robert Cochran as Peter Kerrigan
 Alfred Sangster as Rupert Clayton
 C. M. Hallard as Gabriel Wells
 Raymond Lovell as Robinson, the butler
 Adela Mavis as Zeta
 Frank Atkinson as Lefty
 Ernest Sefton as Newman
 Ian Fleming as Mark Clayton
 Bruce Lester as Derek Clayton
 Mabel Terry-Lewis as Mrs. Fuller

References

Bibliography
 Chibnall, Steve. Quota Quickies: The Birth of the British 'B' Film. British Film Institute, 2007.
 Low, Rachael. Filmmaking in 1930s Britain. George Allen & Unwin, 1985.
 Wood, Linda. British Films, 1927-1939. British Film Institute, 1986.

External links

1934 films
1934 crime films
British crime films
Films directed by Albert Parker
British black-and-white films
1930s English-language films
1930s British films
Quota quickies
Films shot at Wembley Studios
Fox Film films
Films based on British novels